Nõmme (Estonian for "Heath") is a subdistrict in the district of Nõmme, Tallinn, the capital of Estonia.

Nõmme has a station on the Elron western route. The first train station in Nõmme was opened in 1872.

Gallery

References

Subdistricts of Tallinn